The men's high jump event at the 2015 European Athletics Indoor Championships was held on 6 March at 16:05 (qualification) and 7 March at 16:30 (final) local time.

Medalists

Results

Qualification
Qualification: Qualification Performance 2.31 (Q) or at least 8 best performers (q) advanced to the final.

Final

References

2015 European Athletics Indoor Championships
High jump at the European Athletics Indoor Championships